Huaxu (华胥) is a Chinese goddess and mother of the gods Nüwa and Fuxi,whose hometown is a region that is part of modern day Huaxu Township(华胥镇), Lantian County.

Legend
According to legend, the creation god Pangu died after standing up, and his body turned into rivers, mountains, plants, animals, and everything else in the world, among which was a powerful being known as Huaxu.  Huaxu suddenly became pregnant with twins Fuxi and Nüwa after stepping in a footprint left by the thunder god, Leigong.  They are said to be creatures that have faces of human and bodies of snakes.

Legends of the later Yellow Emperor state that, during a period of fasting, the emperor dreamed of Huaxu's mythical kingdom, "beyond the reach of ship or chariot or any mortal foot...only the soul could travel so far."  The residents of this heavenly place "rode space as though walking the solid earth, and slept on the air as though on their beds...mountains and valleys did not trip their feet, for they made only journeys of the spirit."

References

Chinese goddesses